Trinidad and Tobago women's national under-17 football team represents Trinidad and Tobago in international youth football competitions.

FIFA U-17 Women's World Cup

The team qualified for the first time in 2010.

CONCACAF Women's U-17 Championship

Previous squads

2010 FIFA U-17 Women's World Cup

See also

Trinidad and Tobago women's national football team
FIFA U-17 Women's World Cup
UEFA Women's Under-17 Championship

References

External links
Official website

Trinidad and Tobago
U